Dyspessa kabylaria is a species of moth of the family Cossidae. It is found in Iran, Israel, Jordan, Tunisia, Algeria, Egypt and Saudi Arabia.

Adults have been recorded on wing from December to April in Israel.

The larvae probably feed on Allium species.

References

Moths described in 1906
Dyspessa
Moths of Africa
Moths of the Middle East